Marie-Thérèse Perdou de Subligny (1666–1735) was a French ballerina.  She entered the l'Académie Royale de Musique in 1688, where she succeeded Mademoiselle de Lafontaine as prima ballerina, a position she held until 1707.  She appeared mostly in opera ballets of Jean-Baptiste Lully and André Campra. She was the first professional ballerina to appear in England (1702-3).  She was seen as one of the Queens of ballet.

See also
Women in dance

References

French ballerinas
Prima ballerinas
Paris Opera Ballet étoiles
1666 births
1735 deaths
18th-century French actresses
French stage actresses
17th-century ballet dancers
18th-century French ballet dancers
17th-century French people